Stephen John Sewell (born 13 March 1953) is an Australian playwright and screenwriter.

Biography
Born in Liverpool, New South Wales, Sewell's first theatre experience was in the 1970s in the fringe theatre while he was studying Science at the University of Sydney, where his first play was staged in 1975.

In an interview in 2006 Sewell describes himself as an "angry writer" and a workaholic.  Fascinated by the social world, his work ranges across many fields of study, from economics and politics to philosophy and psychology, and while he is considered a writer obsessed with dark themes, he is not himself a pessimist, saying, "No artist, no creator, ever sets forth without hope, even if the thing they create appears to be carved out of pitch black despair."

On 15 October 2012, Sewell was appointed Head of Writing at the National Institute of Dramatic Art.

Awards

Works

Plays
 The Father We Loved on a Beach by the Sea (Currency Press) – first performed at Brisbane's La Boite Theatre Company in 1978; Playbox Theatre Company, Melbourne, 1983
 Traitors (Alternative Publishing Co-operative, Nimrod Theatre Press, 1983) – first performed by the Australian Performing Group at the Pram Factory in Melbourne in 1979
 Anger's Love
 The Blind Giant is Dancing (Currency Press, 1985, c. 1983) – first performed Adelaide 1982
  Welcome the Bright World (Nimrod Theatre Press, 1983)
 Burn Victim – first performed Sydney 1983
 Dreams in an Empty City (Currency Press in association with the State Theatre Company of South Australia, 1986) – first produced Adelaide 1986
 Hate (Currency Press in association with Playbox Theatre Company and Belvoir St Theatre, 1988) – first performed Adelaide 1986
 Miranda – first performed Adelaide 1989
 Sisters (Currency Press in association with Playbox Theatre Company Melbourne, 1991) – first performed Melbourne 1991
 King Golgrutha – first performed Adelaide 1991
 The Garden of Granddaughters (Currency Press; Melbourne: Playbox Theatre Centre of Monash University, 1993) – first performed Melbourne 1993
 Dust (Currency Press, 1997) – first performed Adelaide 1993
 Identity By Helen Demidenko – first performed Adelaide 1996
 The Sick Room (Currency Press in association with Playbox Theatre Centre, Monash University, 1999)
 Myth, Propaganda and Disaster in Nazi Germany and Contemporary America (2003) – One of Australia's most awarded plays, dealing with the War on Terror
 It Just Stopped – premiered at the Malthouse Theatre in Melbourne, and the Belvoir St Theatre in Sydney in 2006 and revived at the Orange Tree Theatre in Richmond, London in 2014
 The Secret Death of Salvador Dalí – first performed Edinburgh Fringe 2002
 The Gates of Egypt – performed at the Belvoir St Theatre in Sydney 2007, Review
 Three Furies: Scenes From the Life of Francis Bacon (2004) – first performed Sydney Opera House as part of the Sydney Festival in January 2005
 The United States of Nothing – first performed at the Stables Theatre, Sydney 2006
 Kandahar Gate – first performed at NIDA's Parade Theatre, Sydney 2014
 Chrysalis (co-written) – first performed at Sydney Opera House 2017
 Arbus & West (about a meeting between Diane Arbus and Mae West) – first performed at the Melbourne Theatre Company

Film scripts
 The Long Way Home (1985)
 Wrong World (1985) (additional dialogue)
 Isabelle Eberhardt (1991)
 True Love and Chaos (1997) (script editor)
 Let's Wait (1998) (writer and director)
 The Boys (Currency Press, 1998)
 Sydney: A Story of a City (1999)
 Foolish (1999) (additional editor)
 Chopper (2000) (script editor)
 Lost Things (2003)
 Sisters (2008)  (writer and director)
 Andy X (2012)
 Embedded (2016)  (writer and director)

Television
 "The Gillies Republic" (1986) – episodes include:
 "The Bjelke-Petersen Republic"
 "The Keating Republic"
 "The Howard Republic"
 "The Hawke Republic"
 "The Singleton Republic"
 "The Carleton Republic"

Books
 Animal Kingdom, a crime story (Victory Books, 2010) a novel based on the film.
 Babylon (Victory Books, 2011)

Notes

External links
 Artist profile – Stephen Sewell
 AustLIT agents details
 Currency Press – author profile (Retrieved 24 February 2008)
 
 Stephen Sewell – Award-Winning Australian Playwright, The British Theatre Guide, interview by Philip Fisher (Retrieved 24 February 2008)
 The Playwrights Database – Stephen Sewell (Retrieved 24 February 2008)
 Theatre at the End of History. A Weekend with Stephen Sewell, 6–8 October 2006, Australian Writers' Guild (Retrieved 24 February 2008)
 Victorian Premier's Literary Awards

1953 births
Living people
Australian screenwriters
Writers from New South Wales
21st-century Australian novelists
21st-century Australian dramatists and playwrights
Australian male novelists
Australian male dramatists and playwrights
21st-century Australian male writers
21st-century Australian screenwriters